In mathematics, the well-ordering theorem, also known as Zermelo's theorem, states that every set can be well-ordered. A set X is well-ordered by a strict total order if every non-empty subset of X has a least element under the ordering. The well-ordering theorem together with Zorn's lemma are the most important mathematical statements that are equivalent to the axiom of choice (often called AC, see also ). Ernst Zermelo introduced the axiom of choice as an "unobjectionable logical principle" to prove the well-ordering theorem. One can conclude from the well-ordering theorem that every set is susceptible to transfinite induction, which is considered by mathematicians to be a powerful technique. One famous consequence of the theorem is the Banach–Tarski paradox.

History
Georg Cantor considered the well-ordering theorem to be a "fundamental principle of thought". In 1904, Gyula Kőnig claimed to have proven that such a well-ordering cannot exist. A few weeks later, Felix Hausdorff found a mistake in the proof. It turned out, though, that in first order logic the well-ordering theorem is equivalent to the axiom of choice, in the sense that the Zermelo–Fraenkel axioms with the axiom of choice included are sufficient to prove the well-ordering theorem, and conversely, the Zermelo–Fraenkel axioms without the axiom of choice but with the well-ordering theorem included are sufficient to prove the axiom of choice. (The same applies to Zorn's lemma.) In second order logic, however, the well-ordering theorem is strictly stronger than the axiom of choice: from the well-ordering theorem one may deduce the axiom of choice, but from the axiom of choice one cannot deduce the well-ordering theorem.
There is a well-known joke about the three statements, and their relative amenability to intuition:The axiom of choice is obviously true, the well-ordering principle obviously false, and who can tell about Zorn's lemma?

Proof from axiom of choice 

That is,  is chosen from the set of elements of  that have not yet been assigned a place in the ordering (or undefined if the entirety of  has been successfully enumerated).

Proof of axiom of choice
The axiom of choice can be proven from the well-ordering theorem as follows.

Particularly, if  contains uncountably many sets, making all uncountably many choices is not allowed under the axioms of Zermelo-Fraenkel set theory without the axiom of choice.

Notes

External links
 Mizar system proof: http://mizar.org/version/current/html/wellord2.html

Axiom of choice
Theorems in the foundations of mathematics
Axioms of set theory